Elif Yıldırım Gören (born February 14, 1990) is a Turkish sprinter, who is specialized in the 400m hurdles event.

Gören qualified as the youngest of her country's national athletics team for participation in the 4 × 400 m relay event at the 2012 Summer Olympics.

Achievements

References

External links

1990 births
People from İznik
Living people
Turkish female sprinters
Turkish female hurdlers
Turkish sportspeople in doping cases
Doping cases in athletics
Bursa Büyükşehir Belediyespor athletes
Survivor Turkey contestants
Enkaspor athletes
20th-century Turkish sportswomen
21st-century Turkish sportswomen